Philippe Soria (born 9 May 1942) is a French sailor who competed in the 1968 Summer Olympics.

After this result he will be a trainer of Serge-Maury riding FINN sailing boat Olympics games 1972 . Result was a Gold Medal … Then, recognized as National Trainer for the Solo Runners, he prepared next generations. Then, with a partnership he open Port Camargue, CYM, a recognized structure to prepare Sailing Trainers, and also Swimming or Tennis Trainers. After this, Port-Camargue where was built the structure received and became the French Base for America Cup Training.

References

1942 births
Living people
French male sailors (sport)
Olympic sailors of France
Sailors at the 1968 Summer Olympics – Finn